Joakim or Joacim is a male given name primarily used in Scandinavian languages and Finnish. It is derived from a transliteration of the Hebrew יהוֹיָקִים, and literally means "lifted by Jehovah". 

In the Old Testament, Jehoiakim was a king of Judah. In deutero-canonical texts, Joakim is the husband of Susanna, the central character in the narrative of Susanna (Daniel 13), and the high priest who leads the people of Israel in prayer in the Book of Judith.

In the Roman Catholic, Orthodox, and Anglican traditions, Saint Joachim was the husband of Saint Anne and the father of Mary, the mother of Jesus. The story of Joachim and Anne appears first in the apocryphal Gospel of James: Joachim and Anne are not mentioned in the Bible. 

Notable people with the  name Joakim or Joacim include:
Joakim Alexandersson (born 1976), Swedish football player
Joakim Andersson (born 1971), Swedish diver
Joakim Andersson (born 1989), Swedish ice hockey player
Joakim Assenmacher (born 1963), German long jumper
Joakim Austnes (born 1983), Norwegian football player
Joakim Berg (born 1970), Swedish musician
Joakim Bonnier (1930–1972), Swedish motor racer
Joakim Bäckström (born 1978), Swedish golfer
Joakim Brodén (born 1980), Swedish-Czech musician, lead singer of the metal band Sabaton
Joacim Cans (born 1970), Swedish musician
Joakim Cronman (1638–1703), Swedish soldier
Joacim Eriksson (born 1990), Swedish ice hockey player
Joakim Eriksson (born 1979), Swedish ice hockey player
Joacim Esbjörs (born 1970), Swedish ice hockey player
Joakim Garff (born 1960), Danish theologian
Joakim Gruev (1828–1912), Bulgarian writer
Joakim Haeggman (born 1969), Swedish golfer
Joakim Halvarsson (born 1972), Swedish ski mountaineer
Joakim Hedqvist (born 1977), Swedish bandy player
Joakim Hellstrand (born 1984), Swedish Youtuber and Twitch streamer
Joakim Hillding (born 1988), Swedish ice hockey player
Joakim Holmquist (born 1969), Swedish swimmer
Joakim Ingelsson, Swedish orienteer
Joakim Jonsson, Swedish drummer
Joakim Karchovski (c. 1750 – 1820), Macedonian writer
Joakim Karlsson (kickboxer), Swedish kickboxer
Joakim Karlsson (footballer) (born 1989), Swedish footballer
Joakim Karlsson (guitar player), guitarist of the American Metalcore band Bad Omens
Joakim Lindengren (born 1962), Swedish cartoonist
Joakim Lindström (born 1983), Swedish ice hockey player
Joakim Lystad (born 1953), Norwegian civil servant
Joakim Nätterqvist (born 1974), Swedish actor
Joakim Nilsson (footballer born 1966), Swedish football player
Joakim Nilsson (footballer born 1985), Swedish football player
Joakim Nilsson (born 1971), Swedish javelin thrower
Joakim Noah (born 1985), American–French–Swedish basketball player
Joakim Nyström (born 1963), Swedish tennis player
Joacim Persson, Swedish record producer and songwriter, see Twin (production team)
Joakim Persson (born 1975), Swedish football player
Joakim Petersson (born 1983), Swedish member of the band Vains of Jenna
Joakim Pirinen (born 1961), Swedish cartoonist
Joakim Puhk (1888–1942), Estonian businessman
Joakim Sandell (born 1974), Swedish politician
Joakim Frederik Schouw (1789–1852), Danish lawyer
Joakim Sjöhage (born 1986), Swedish football player
Joakim Soria (born 1984), Mexican baseball player
Joakim Stulić (1730–1817), Croatian lexicographer
Joakim Sundström (born 1965), Swedish sound designer and musician
Joakim Thåström (born 1957), Swedish musician
Joacim Tuuri (born 1989), Finnish footballer
Joakim Vujić (1772–1847), Serbian dramatist

See also
 Joachim (given name)
 Joaquim
 Joaquín

References 

Scandinavian masculine given names
Danish masculine given names
Estonian masculine given names
Norwegian masculine given names
Swedish masculine given names
Finnish masculine given names